Victoria is a federal electoral district in British Columbia, Canada, that has been represented in the House of Commons of Canada from 1872 to 1904 and since 1925.

The riding was originally chartered as Victoria District for the special byelections held in 1871 upon the province's entry into Confederation. But, like the other B.C. ridings with that appellation, the "District" was dropped once the temporary ridings were ratified and made "permanent" for the general election of 1872; this was the first in which the Victoria riding (by that name) appeared.  From 1905 up until the 1925 election, Victoria was represented by the riding of Victoria City.

Demographics

Ethnic groups (2006): 85.54% White, 4.05% Chinese, 3.07% Aboriginal, 1.26% South Asian, 1.22% Japanese, 1.15% Filipino, 1.09% Black 
Languages (2011): 83.93% English, 2.92% Chinese, 1.79% French, 1.40% German 
Religions (2001): 35.36% Protestant, 15.05% Catholic, 3.94% Other Christian, 1.62% Buddhist, 40.52% No religion
Median income (2005): $24,022

Geography
It covers the entire city of Victoria, the municipality of Oak Bay and the southeastern portion of the municipality of Saanich. It also includes the University of Victoria.

Riding associations

Riding associations are the local branches of the national political parties:

History
This electoral district was created in 1872 when Victoria District riding was abolished. It elected two members to the House of Commons of Canada through Block voting. Of the two it elected in 1872, one was the first Jewish MP of Canada; the other served as MP while also serving as premier of the province.

In 1878, Sir John A. Macdonald was parachuted into the riding, as he was unelectable in eastern Canada, in the wake of the Pacific Scandal. Macdonald, previously the MP for the Marquette riding in Manitoba, had to run in a by-election as he had been appointed to the cabinet (to serve as prime minister). He chose Victoria, which had not yet held its portion of the 1878 federal election. Victorians voted for him enthusiastically, as he promised to finally bring about the construction of what became the Canadian Pacific Railway. He did not run for re-election in Victoria, instead securing a safe seat in Ontario in 1882.

It was abolished in 1903, and split into Victoria City and Nanaimo ridings.

It was re-created in 1924 from the Victoria City riding, electing one member to the House of Commons.

A redistribution in 1966 trimmed the size of the riding slightly, removing parts of Saanich west of Cedar Hill Road and north of Cedar Hill Cross Road.

Victoria was one of two electoral districts in British Columbia that saw no changes to its boundaries proposed following the 2012 federal electoral boundaries redistribution.

Members of Parliament

This riding has elected the following Members of Parliament:

{| class="wikitable"
|- bgcolor="CCCCCC"
! Parliament
! Years
! colspan="2" | Member
! Party
! colspan="2" | Member
! Party
|-
| bgcolor="#F0F0F0" colspan="8" align="center" | VictoriaRiding created from Victoria District
|-
| bgcolor="whitesmoke" align="center" | 2nd
| 1872–1874
|  |    
| Henry Nathan, Jr.
| Liberal
| rowspan="3"  |    
| rowspan="3" | Amor De Cosmos
| rowspan="3" | Liberal
|-
| bgcolor="whitesmoke" align="center" | 3rd
| 1874–1878
|  |    
| Francis James Roscoe
| Independent Liberal
|-
| bgcolor="whitesmoke" align="center" | 4th
| 1878–1882
|  |    
| John A. Macdonald
| Liberal–Conservative
|-
| bgcolor="whitesmoke" align="center" | 5th
| 1882–1887
| rowspan="7"  |    
| rowspan="2" | Noah Shakespeare
| rowspan="7" | Conservative
| rowspan="8"  |    
| rowspan="3" | Edgar Crow Baker
| rowspan="8" | Conservative
|-
| rowspan="3" bgcolor="whitesmoke" align="center" | 6th
| align="center" | 1887
|-
| 1888–1889
| rowspan="5" | Edward Gawler Prior
|-
| 1889–1891
| rowspan="5" | Thomas Earle
|-
| bgcolor="whitesmoke" align="center" | 7th
| 1891–1896
|-
| bgcolor="whitesmoke" align="center" | 8th
| 1896–1900
|-
| rowspan="2" bgcolor="whitesmoke" align="center" | 9th
| 1900–1902
|-
| 1902–1904
|  |    
| George Riley
| Liberal
|-
| bgcolor="#F0F0F0" colspan="8" align="center" | Riding dissolved into Victoria City and Nanaimo
|-
| bgcolor="#F0F0F0" colspan="8" align="center" | 'VictoriaRiding re-created from'' Victoria City
|-

Current Member of Parliament
The current Member of Parliament for Victoria is Laurel Collins of the New Democratic Party, a former sociology instructor at the University of Victoria, and Victoria City Councillor.

Election results

1925–present
The Victoria riding name was re-established as a one-member seat in 1924.

1925-1984

1872–1902

The Victoria riding was abolished in 1903.  Successor ridings were Victoria City and, for western parts of the riding, Nanaimo. This riding elected two members to parliament.

See also
 List of Canadian federal electoral districts
 Past Canadian electoral districts

References

 Expenditures – 2004
 Expenditures – 2000
 Expenditures – 1997

Notes

External links
 Website of the Parliament of Canada

British Columbia federal electoral districts on Vancouver Island
Politics of Victoria, British Columbia
Saanich, British Columbia
British Columbia federal electoral districts